Ear Falls Water Aerodrome  is located  south southeast of Ear Falls, Ontario, Canada.

See also
Ear Falls Airport

References

Registered aerodromes in Kenora District
Seaplane bases in Ontario